Irene Bucher is a Swiss orienteering competitor. She won a bronze medal in the relay at the World Orienteering Championships in Thun in 1981, together with Ruth Schmid, Annelies Meier and Ruth Humbel.

References

Year of birth missing (living people)
Living people
Swiss orienteers
Female orienteers
Foot orienteers
World Orienteering Championships medalists
20th-century Swiss women